CCT Rail System Corporation is a US shortline railroad holding company that owns and operates the Rogue Valley Terminal Railroad Corporation.

The company was founded in Superior, Wisconsin.  In June 2014, the company relocated its offices to White City, Oregon in order to be closer to the rail operations of Rogue Valley Terminal Railroad

History 

The company was founded on November 20, 2012 as RVTR Rail Holdings LLC for the purpose of acquiring the WCTU Railway LLC (WCTR) from Marmon Transportation Services LLC, a unit of Berkshire Hathaway.  CCT successfully acquired WCTR on December 17, 2012.

To effectively re-organize and re-brand the company as a platform for acquiring and operating other North American shortline railroads in the future, the company was renamed the CCT Rail System Corporation on March 15, 2013.  The company's then-sole subsidiary, WCTR, was also renamed Rogue Valley Terminal Railroad Corporation (RVT) on the same date, in order to better market the broader Southern Oregon region served by the railroad.

In March 2019, the company launched Safe Route Railcar Services Corporation, a private railcar storage, maintenance and cleaning firm, which later ceased operations in January 2022.  In November 2022, the company launched Rogue Reload Corporation, its first truck-to-rail  transload service.

Locomotive Fleet

External links 

 CCT Rail System Corporation official website

References

United States railroad holding companies
Companies based in Oregon
Transportation in Jackson County, Oregon
Oregon railroads
Railway companies established in 2012
American companies established in 2012
2012 establishments in Oregon
Transportation companies based in Oregon